Genesis Lynea Edwards (born 20 October 1989) is a Bermudian-born British actress, dancer and singer. She originated the role of Anna of Cleves in Six. On television, she is known for her roles as in the BBC medical drama Casualty (2019–2020) and the crime drama Silent Witness (2021).

Early life
Lynea was born in Bermuda to parents Lionel Edwards and Ginea "Adi" Wolf. Her father is a self-taught saxophonist and her mother is an actress and singer. Her credits include Tina as GG in the 2020 Hamburg production at Operettenhaus.

In summer 1997, Lynea's mother was accepted into the Performing Arts programme at Middlesex University and the two moved to London, followed soon after by her stepfather. The three lived in North London where Lynea attended Trent C of E Primary School and began secondary school at Ashmole Academy before the family moved back to Bermuda for three years. After starting her Geography degree at King's College London, Lynea decided she wanted to be a performer and transferred to Arts Educational School (ArtsEd) in Chiswick, graduating with a Bachelor of Arts in Musical Theatre in 2013.

Career
Lynea's first performing experience was at the ENO as a part of the children's ensemble for The Magic Flute. Once the family moved back to London in 2006, Lynea went to LaSwap where she and some friends founded Britain's first Krump family, called Krumpire, which later developed into Wet Wipez. Soon after, she featured in Jessie J's debut music video "Do It Like A Dude". For the 2012 London Olympics, she was selected for Project 32 as an ambassador for Adidas. Lynea's early stage work included roles in productions of The Bodyguard, Bend It Like Beckham: The Musical, the Olivier Award winning Jesus Christ Superstar, and In the Heights as well as the role of Pilar in a 2016 production of Legally Blonde at The Curve in Leicester.

Lynea starred in the 2017 production of The Wild Party at The Other Palace. She then landed roles in Ode to Leeds  at West Yorkshire Playhouse and Collective Rage: A Play in Five Betties. She landed the starring role of Anna of Cleves in the original cast of Six at the Arts Theatre and recording on the 2018 SIX Studio album that has recently sold over 100,000 copies worldwide. Lynea made her television debut in 2018 with the main role of Miss Maddie Harper in series 7 and 8 of CBBC series 4 O'Clock Club. She secured her first theatrical lead at The Old Vic in Sylvia.

Lynea has filmed a few short films including Love is a Hand Grenade which won 'Best LGBT' at the Bristol Independent Film Festival. Cost of Living was selected for Raindance Film Festival 2021 and BFI Flare London Film Festival. Her most recent short film Finding Dad made the official selection for Berlin British Shorts Film Festival and Leeds Film Festival.

On 23 March 2019, she began appearing as Archie Hudson in the BBC medical drama Casualty. In 2021 she joined the cast for series 24 of the long-running BBC crime drama Silent Witness as pathologist Simone Tyler. She also made a guest appearance as the inferni Natacha in the Netflix series Shadow and Bone. The following year, she had recurring roles as vampire Geraldine Newcopse in the third series of the Sky series A Discovery of Witches and Sam in the horror comedy The Baby, also on Sky.

Personal life
Lynea identifies as queer, and appeared in an issue of the Gay Times in 2019.

Filmography

Television and film

Music videos

Stage

References

External links
 

Living people
Actresses from London
Bermudian actresses
Bermudian expatriates in the United Kingdom
Black British actresses
LGBT Black British people
English LGBT actors
Bermudian LGBT people
People educated at the Arts Educational Schools
People educated at the BRIT School
People from Wandsworth
Queer actresses
Queer women
British LGBT singers
1989 births
British musical theatre actresses